The 73rd New York State Legislature, consisting of the New York State Senate and the New York State Assembly, met from January 1 to April 10, 1850, during the second year of Hamilton Fish's governorship, in Albany.

Background
Under the provisions of the New York Constitution of 1846, 32 Senators were elected in single-seat senatorial districts for a two-year term, the whole Senate being renewed biennially. The senatorial districts (except those in New York City) were made up of entire counties. 128 Assemblymen were elected in single-seat districts to a one-year term, the whole Assembly being renewed annually. The Assembly districts were made up of entire towns, or city wards, forming a contiguous area, all in the same county. The City and County of New York was divided into four senatorial districts, and 16 Assembly districts.

At this time there were two major political parties: the Democratic Party and the Whig Party. After the split in 1848, the Democratic factions (see Barnburners and Hunkers and Free Soil Party) held separate state conventions, but ran joint tickets. The Anti-Rent Party mostly endorsed Whig or Democratic nominees, and was the balance of power at this election.

Elections
The New York state election, 1849 was held on November 6. The eight statewide elective offices up for election were carried by 4 Whigs, 3 Hunkers and 1 Barnburner, all of whom had been endorsed by the Anti-Renters.

17 Whigs and 15 Democrats were elected to a two-year term in the State Senate (1850–1851). 64 Whigs and 64 Democrats were declared elected to the State Assembly, resulting in a "split Assembly."

Sessions
The Legislature met for the regular session at the Old State Capitol in Albany on January 1, 1850; and adjourned on April 10.

64 Democrats and 64 Whigs appeared at the opening of the session, constituting a "split assembly." The election of Daniel Fullerton (W) was contested, and objections were raised to his taking the seat. In view of the precedent of 1816 (see 39th New York State Legislature#Sessions), upon taking his seat, Fullerton "claimed to have been fairly, legally and equitably chosen," but "not desiring to cause any delay or embarrassment in the organization of the House," he "declined to vote or take any part in the election of officers of the House." Noble S. Elderkin (D) was elected Speaker with 63 votes against 62 for Robert H. Pruyn (W). Elderkin and Pruyn did not vote, as the candidates traditionally did not vote for themselves. After much haggling, James R. Rose (D) was elected Clerk of the Assembly with 64 votes against 63 for the incumbent Philander B. Prindle (W).

On January 24, leave of absence for two weeks was granted to Speaker Elderkin to go home to his ill wife

On January 26, Robert H. Pruyn was chosen, by unanimous consent, Speaker pro tempore to preside over the Assembly during the absence of Speaker Elderkin who was expected to return at some later time, but did not appear again during the remainder of the session.

On February 26, Daniel T. Durland (D) was seated in place of Fullerton (W) which ended the "split Assembly" and gave the Democrats a nominal majority of 2. Due to the absence of Speaker Elderkin, de facto the Whigs had a majority of 1, which was inverted after seating Durland.

On March 13, Ferral C. Dininny (D) was elected Speaker pro tempore, to succeed Pruyn, to preside over the Assembly during the continued absence of Speaker Elderkin who was by then not expected to return during this session.

State Senate

Districts

 1st District: Queens, Richmond and Suffolk counties
 2nd District: Kings County
 3rd District: 1st, 2nd, 3rd, 4th, 5th and 6th wards of New York City
 4th District: 7th, 10th, 13th and 17th wards of New York City
 5th District: 8th, 9th and 14th wards of New York City
 6th District: 11th, 12th, 15th, 16th, 18th, 19th, 20th, 21st and 22nd wards of New York City
 7th District: Putnam,  Rockland and Westchester counties
 8th District: Columbia and Dutchess counties
 9th District: Orange and Sullivan counties
 10th District: Greene and Ulster counties
 11th District: Albany and Schenectady counties
 12th District: Rensselaer County
 13th District: Saratoga and Washington counties
 14th District: Clinton, Essex and Warren counties
 15th District: Franklin and St. Lawrence counties
 16th District: Fulton, Hamilton, Herkimer and Montgomery counties
 17th District: Delaware and Schoharie counties
 18th District: Chenango and Otsego counties
 19th District: Oneida County
 20th District: Madison and Oswego counties
 21st District: Jefferson and Lewis counties
 22nd District: Onondaga County
 23rd District: Broome, Cortland and Tioga counties
 24th District: Cayuga and Wayne counties
 25th District: Seneca, Tompkins and Yates counties
 26th District: Chemung and Steuben counties
 27th District: Monroe County
 28th District: Genesee, Niagara and Orleans counties
 29th District: Livingston and Ontario counties
 30th District: Allegany and Wyoming counties
 31st District: Erie County
 32nd District: Cattaraugus and Chautauqua counties

Note: There are now 62 counties in the State of New York. The counties which are not mentioned in this list had not yet been established, or sufficiently organized, the area being included in one or more of the abovementioned counties.

Members
The asterisk (*) denotes members of the previous Legislature who continued in office as members of this Legislature. John A. Cross and James W. Beekman changed from the Assembly to the Senate.

Employees
 Clerk: William H. Bogart
 Sergeant-at-Arms: George W. Bull
 Doorkeeper: Ransom Van Valkenburgh
 Assistant Doorkeeper: George A. Loomis

State Assembly

Assemblymen
The asterisk (*) denotes members of the previous Legislature who continued as members of this Legislature. Frederick S. Martin changed from the Senate to the Assembly.

Party affiliations follow the vote on Speaker.

Employees
 Clerk: James R. Rose
 Sergeant-at-Arms: Samuel Reynolds
 Doorkeeper: John K. Anderson
 First Assistant Doorkeeper: Matthew Higgins
 Second Assistant Doorkeeper: Thomas Hollenbeck

Notes

Sources
 The New York Civil List compiled by Franklin Benjamin Hough (Weed, Parsons and Co., 1858) [pg. 109 for Senate districts; pg. 136 for senators; pg. 148–157 for Assembly districts; pg. 238ff for assemblymen]
 Journal of the Senate (73rd Session) (1850)

073
1850 in New York (state)
1850 U.S. legislative sessions